Willie the Kid (foaled 1937 in Ontario) was a Canadian Thoroughbred racehorse best known for winning the eighty-first running of the King's Plate, Canada's most important race.

Bred by Willie Morrissey, Willie the Kid got his owner's nickname. He was out of the mare Mintwina, who was also the dam of Morrissey's Canadian Horse Racing Hall of Fame inductee, Bunty Lawless. He was sired by Roselyon who had sired the 1930 King's Plate winner, Aymond. Roselyon was a son of the 1911 Epsom Derby winner and British Horseracing Hall of Fame inductee, Sunstar.

Willie the Kid raced under the name of Willie Morrissey's  girlfriend, Miss Mildred A. Kane. Trained by Gordon McCann, the oft-injured colt did not race at age two but as a three-year-old won three times in ten starts. In the May 18, 1940 King's Plate he beat a field that included Curwen, the Harry Hatch-owned colt who had been sent off as the betting favorite. The victory marked the first time a female owner won the Plate, and it was the first of six career Plate wins for trainer Gordon McCann.

In the ensuing Prince of Wales Stakes, Willie the Kid again beat third-place finisher Curwen but was second to race winner, Hood. Willie the Kid came out of the race with an injury that ended his racing career. He was retired to stud duty but was not a success.

1937 racehorse births
Racehorses bred in Ontario
Racehorses trained in Canada
King's Plate winners
Thoroughbred family 23-b